The Koritnica, with a length slightly over , is a right tributary of the Soča River. It empties into the Soča southeast of Bovec.

See also 
List of rivers of Slovenia

References

External links
The Koritnica River on Geopedia 

Rivers of the Slovene Littoral
Rivers of the Julian Alps